Sary-Mogol is a village in Osh Region of Kyrgyzstan. It is part of the Alay District. Its population was 5,215 in 2021. It lies in the Alay Valley, north of the river Kyzyl-Suu, 32 km west of Sary-Tash.

Population

Climate

References

Populated places in Osh Region